Giancarlo Primo (November 4, 1924, Rome – December 27, 2005, Civita Castellana, Italy) was an Italian professional basketball player and coach. He was a coach of the FIBA European Selection team in 1974, 1975, and 1976. In 2001, he was awarded the FIBA Order of Merit. In 2007, he was enshrined into the FIBA Hall of Fame, and in 2008, he was inducted into the Italian Basketball Hall of Fame.

Club playing career
During his club playing career, Primo played with Società Ginnastica Roma.

National team playing career
As a player of the senior Italian national team, Primo participated at the EuroBasket 1947, the 1948 Summer Olympic Games, the EuroBasket 1949, and the 1951 Mediterranean Games, where he won a bronze medal.

Coaching career
After retiring as a player, Primo became the head coach of the senior Italian women's national team, participating at the EuroBasket Women 1960, the EuroBasket Women 1962, the 1967 FIBA World Championship for Women, and the EuroBasket Women 1968.

From 1968 to 1979, he was the head coach of the senior Italian men's national team, winning bronze medals at the EuroBasket 1971, and the EuroBasket 1975. He coached Italy at the: 1972 Summer Olympic Games, the 1976 Summer Olympic Games, the 1970 FIBA World Championship, the 1978 FIBA World Championship, and 6 EuroBasket tournaments. In total, he coached Italy in 238 games. While he was coaching the senior Italian national team, Italy defeated, for the first time, both the United States, at the 1970 FIBA World Championship, and the Soviet Union, at the 1977 EuroBasket.

After 1979, he coached the club teams: Livorno (1980–1982), Cantù (1982–1983, winning the FIBA Intercontinental Cup and the FIBA European Champions Cup (EuroLeague)), SB Gorizia (1983–1984), O.T.C. Livorno (1984–1985), and Virtus Roma (1987–1989).

See also 
 List of EuroLeague-winning head coaches

External links 
 FIBA Player Profile
 FIBA Europe Player Profile
 FIBA Hall of Fame page on Primo
 Italian League Coach Profile 

1924 births
2005 deaths
Basketball players from Rome
FIBA Hall of Fame inductees
Italian basketball coaches
Italian men's basketball players
Olympic basketball players of Italy
Basketball players at the 1948 Summer Olympics
EuroLeague-winning coaches
Pallacanestro Cantù coaches
Shooting guards
Pallacanestro Virtus Roma coaches
Nuova Pallacanestro Gorizia coaches
Libertas Liburnia Basket Livorno coaches